William Albert Anderson (January 25, 1913 – March 25, 1971) was an American baseball pitcher in the Negro leagues in the 1940s.

A native of Brevard, North Carolina, Anderson played mostly with the New York Cubans from 1941 to 1946, and briefly with the Homestead Grays in 1943 and the Newark Eagles in 1947. He also played with the Drummondville Royals of the Provincial League in 1953. Anderson died in Cincinnati, Ohio in 1971 at age 58.

References

External links
 and Baseball-Reference Black Baseball Stats and  Seamheads 

Drummondville Royals players
Homestead Grays players
Newark Eagles players
New York Cubans players
1913 births
1971 deaths
Baseball pitchers
Baseball players from North Carolina
People from Brevard, North Carolina